C-type lectin domain family 1 member A is a protein that in humans is encoded by the CLEC1A gene.

This gene encodes a member of the C-type lectin/C-type lectin-like domain (CTL/CTLD) superfamily. Members of this family share a common protein fold and have diverse functions, such as cell adhesion, cell-cell signalling, glycoprotein turnover, and roles in inflammation and immune response. The encoded protein may play a role in regulating dendritic cell function. Alternative splice variants have been described but their biological nature has not been determined. This gene is closely linked to other CTL/CTLD superfamily members on chromosome 12p13 in the natural killer gene complex region.

References

External links

Further reading

C-type lectins